Tabite or Not Tabite is a 2005 Moroccan drama film directed by Nabyl Lahlou. The film was inspired by the trial of Mohamed Tabet. Tabet's family filed a complaint to prohibit the preview of the film. Summoned to court in Rabat, the director successfully pleaded his case himself, arguing that it was his duty to make films about this period. The preview was ultimately held at the Mohamed V Theater in Rabat.

Synopsis 
Ali Brahma visits his homeland for the first time in order to attend his father's funeral. This first trip to Morocco coincides with the trial of police commissioner and serial rapist Mohamed Mustapha Tabit. On the flight back to Paris, Ali meets Zakia Malik. Together, they look into the Tabet trial to write a play and a film script.

Cast 

 Sophia Hadi
 Nabyl Lahlou
 Amal Ayouch
 Mourad Abderrahim
 Younes Megri
 Othmane Jennane

Awards and accolades 

 Prize for Best Scenario at the 9th edition of the Moroccan National Film Festival in Tangier

References 

2005 drama films
Moroccan drama films
2000s Arabic-language films
2005 films
Films directed by Nabyl Lahlou